Eucalyptus blakelyi, known as Blakely's red gum, is a tree endemic to eastern Australia. It has smooth bark on its trunk and branches, dull bluish green, lance-shaped adult leaves, flower buds usually in groups of seven, white flowers and cup-shaped to hemispherical fruit.

Description
The bark on the trunk and branches is smooth, pale grey, cream-coloured and white with patches of other colours. Flowering occurs from October to December and the flowers are white.

Taxonomy and naming
Eucalyptus blakelyi was first formally described in 1917 by Joseph Maiden from a specimen collected in the Pilliga scrub by Harald Jensen. The description was published in A Critical Revision of the Genus Eucalyptus. The specific epithet (blakelyi) honours Maiden's assistant, William Faris Blakely.

Distribution and habitat
Blakely's red gum grows in woodland and open forest, mainly on the tablelands of New South Wales and the Australian Capital Territory but also in the far south-east of Queensland and north-eastern Victoria. It sometimes grows in seasonally waterlogged depressions but also on stony rises.

References

blakelyi
Myrtales of Australia
Flora of New South Wales
Flora of Queensland
Flora of Victoria (Australia)
Trees of Australia
Plants described in 1917
Taxa named by Joseph Maiden